Herman Wald (Kolozsvár, July 7, 1906 – Johannesburg, July 4, 1970) was a sculptor from Austria-Hungary of Jewish origin who worked in South Africa.

Biography
He was born to an orthodox Jewish family in Kolozsvár, modern Cluj-Napoca. His father was Jakab Wald rabbi, and his mother was the daughter of rabbi Mózes Glasner. His first success was a sculpture made of wood about Tivadar Herzl. He showed it to his father, who afterward did not block his artistic career. He finished his studies at the Hungarian University of Fine Arts in Budapest, and later he learnt at Wien and Berlin as well. As a result of the fascist ideas in the German speaking countries, he moved to Paris and later to London, where he taught sculpture studies. His brother, Márk invited him to the Union of South Africa. He went there and settled in Johannesburg. He founded here an artist studio. He married in 1942 with Vera Rosenbaum, and they had three children (Michael, Pamela, Louis).

He served in the Army during World War II. He took a half-year trip to Israel, Rome, Paris and New York in 1952.

Sculptures
His most well known sculptures are the following ones:
 Kria, Sandringham, 1949
 Memorial of the Six Million, Johannesburg, 1959 
 Diamond Diggers, Johannesburg, 1960
 Man and his Soul
 The Unknown Miner
 Impala Fountain

Sources
 Wald Herman-home page
 Jewish Affairs, Pesach 2012

Further information
 Video
 His works
 His open air works

1906 births
1970 deaths
Artists from Cluj-Napoca
Romanian Jews
Austro-Hungarian Jews
South African sculptors
Hungarian University of Fine Arts alumni
20th-century sculptors
Hungarian emigrants to South Africa